Henneman is a surname. Notable people with the surname include:

Aaron Henneman (born 1980), Australian rules footballer
Brian Henneman, American musician
Charles Henneman (1866–?), American shot putter
Ig Henneman (born 1945), Dutch composer
Mike Henneman (born 1961), American baseball player

See also 
Hennemann